Hoff is a civil parish in the Eden District, Cumbria, England.  It contains nine listed buildings that are recorded in the National Heritage List for England.  Of these, three are listed at Grade II*, the middle of the three grades, and the others are at Grade II, the lowest grade.  The parish is mainly rural, with scattered communities, and the listed buildings are all houses, farmhouses, or farm buildings.


Key

Buildings

Notes and references

Notes

Citations

Sources

Lists of listed buildings in Cumbria